Lanting may refer to:

Frans Lanting a Dutch wildlife photographer, born in 1951
Lanting, a surname of Dutch origin, patronymic from an old personal name, Latin Lanterus, of uncertain origin, perhaps Landher (see Lanthier (disambiguation)).
The Orchid Pavilion (Lanting), scene of the Orchid Pavilion Gathering event, in 353